What a Song Can Do (Chapter One) is the third extended play by American country music trio Lady Antebellum, and their first since shortening their group name to Lady A from Lady Antebellum. It was released through Big Machine on June 25, 2021.

Release and promotion
"Like a Lady", the album's first single, was performed on The Ellen DeGeneres Show on May 19, 2021. Lady A announced What a Song Can Do on June 9.

Tour
Lady A will embark on the What a Song Can Do Tour in support of the album. It began on July 29, 2021, in Uncasville, Connecticut.

Track listing

Personnel
Adapted from What a Song Can Do album liner notes.

Lady A
Dave Haywood – vocals (all tracks), acoustic guitar (all tracks), mandolin (tracks 1, 2, 4, 6), strings (track 1), synthesizer (track 1), bar noise (track 1)
Charles Kelley – vocals (all tracks)
Hillary Scott – vocals (all tracks)

Musicians 
David Angell – violin (track 7) 
Monisa Angell – viola (track 7)
Kevin Bate – cello (track 7)
Jenny Bifano – violin (track 7)
Tom Bukovac – electric guitar (all tracks)
Dave Cohen – B-3 organ (tracks 1, 2, 6), keyboards (track 3), piano (tracks 2, 4-7), synthesizer (tracks 4, 5, 7)
David Davidson – violin (track 7)
Stuart Duncan – fiddle (track 3)
Justin Ebach – electric guitar (track 5), programming (track 5), synthesizer (track 5), synth bass (track 5)
Sam Ellis – programming (track 2)
Alicia Enstrom – violin (track 7)
Paul Franklin – steel guitar (tracks 2, 4, 5)
Jesse Frasure – programming (track 4)
Austin Hoke – cello (track 7)
Dann Huff – bouzouki (track 5), dobro (tracks 3, 5), dobro solo (track 5), electric guitar (all tracks except 4 & 7), electric guitar solo (tracks 1-3, 6), high string acoustic guitar (track 5), programming (tracks 2-4), synth bass (track 3)
David Huff – programming (all tracks)
Jun Iwasaki – violin (track 7)
Martin Johnson – electric guitar (track 3)
Charlie Judge – piano (track 2), synthesizer (tracks 2, 5, 7)
Betsy Lamb – viola (track 7)
Justin Niebank – programming (all tracks except 3)
Brandon Paddock – dobro (track 3), programming (track 3)
Jordan Reynolds – programming (track 1)
Jimmie Lee Sloas – bass guitar (all tracks)
Aaron Sterling – drums (all tracks), percussion (tracks 3, 6, 7)
Ilya Toshinsky – acoustic guitar (all tracks except 3 & 7), banjo (tracks 3, 5), dobro (track 7) mandolin (track 3)
Kris Wilkinson – string arrangements (track 7)
Karen Winkelmann – violin (track 7)

Production 
Sean R. Badum – assistant engineer 
Jesse Brock – mixing assistant 
Mike "Frog" Griffith – production coordination 
Dann Huff – producer
David Huff - editing
Martin Johnson – producer
Joe LaPorta — mastering
Steve Marcantonio – recording 
Buckley Miller – recording 
Steve Moffitt – mixing
Justin Nieback – mixing
Brian Paddock – producing
Chris Small – editing 
Michael Walter – assistant engineer

Charts

References

2021 albums
Lady A albums
Albums produced by Dann Huff